Tom Arnone is an American politician currently serving as a member of the Connecticut House of Representatives. Arnone is a Democrat who represents district 58, which includes part of the town of Enfield. Arnone was first elected to the seat in 2018, winning by an 8-point margin over Republican Greg Stokes. Arnone was then re-elected by a 12 point margin in 2020 over Enfield Republican Town Chairwoman Mary Ann Turner. Arnone currently serves as ranking member of the Legislative Regulation Review Committee, as well as a member of the Planning and Development and Public Health committee.

References

Year of birth missing (living people)
Living people
Place of birth missing (living people)
Democratic Party members of the Connecticut House of Representatives